Esther Povitsky (born March 2, 1988), formerly known by the stage name "Little Esther", is an American actress and comedian. She is the co-creator and star of the comedy series Alone Together (2018), and starred as Izzy in the Hulu series Dollface. Her debut comedy special, Hot for My Name, premiered on Comedy Central on July 17, 2020.

Early life and education
Esther Povitsky was born in Chicago, Illinois to Mary and Morrie Povitsky. Her father is of Russian-Jewish descent and her mother is a Christian of Finnish descent who worked as an administrative assistant at the Youth Services of Glenview/Northbrook. She has one older half-sister from her mother's first marriage. Povitsky was raised in the Chicago suburb of Skokie, where she graduated from Niles North High School in 2006. 

Following high school, Povitsky attended the University of Illinois at Urbana–Champaign for three years before dropping out to pursue a career in stand-up comedy and acting. "I was really unhappy at my school," Povitsky recalled. "A lot of people were in sororities and a lot of people drank all the time, and I wasn't into either of those things, so I really did not feel like I fit in." She subsequently studied comedy at iO Chicago and The Second City in Chicago before relocating to Los Angeles, where she took classes with The Groundlings. In Los Angeles, Povitsky has performed regularly at The Comedy Store, The Ice House, and The Improv.

Career

2012–2014: Early projects
Povitsky recurred as Maya on the series Crazy Ex-Girlfriend from 2016 until 2019. Other television appearances include Brooklyn Nine-Nine, Love, and Parks and Recreation. Povitsky also survived several rounds of 2015's Last Comic Standing (season 9).

Povitsky was the first female guest to appear on The Joe Rogan Experience, after which she began podcasting with Deathsquad.tv regularly. She hosted Little Esther's Piecast and was the former co-host of Brode & Esther with fellow comedian Brody Stevens as well as Weird Adults with Little Esther and Glowing Up, a makeup and beauty-themed podcast which she co-hosts with writer Caroline Goldfarb. She often appears as a guest on the network's Ice House Chronicles.

In 2012, Povitsky turned down an offer from MTV to do a reality show based on her life as a comedian because she felt the series would be too invasive.

2015–present: Alone Together and Hot for My Name

In 2015, Povitsky wrote, starred in, and produced the short film Alone Together. The short was later adapted into a pilot for Freeform, produced by The Lonely Island. In December 2016, the pilot was picked up to series. In October, 2017, Freeform renewed the series for a second season ahead of its January 2018 debut. The series was canceled after its second season in 2019.

On July 17, 2020, Povitsky's debut comedy special, Hot for My Name, was released through Comedy Central.

Fashion brand 
Povitsky runs her own fashion brand, "Sleepover by Esther," which she advertises using Instagram. She regularly advertises her brand on the Trash Tuesday podcast and often features in her Instagram posts modelling her brand's clothing.

Filmography

Film

Television

Comedy specials

Podcasts

References

External links

 
 Podcast - Glowing Up
 Podcast - Weird Adults with Little Esther

1988 births
Actresses from Chicago
Actresses from Illinois
American film actresses
American people of Finnish descent
American people of Russian-Jewish descent
American stand-up comedians
American television actresses
American women comedians
American women podcasters
American podcasters
Comedians from Illinois
People from Decatur, Illinois
Living people
People from Skokie, Illinois
University of Illinois Urbana-Champaign alumni
Upright Citizens Brigade Theater performers
21st-century American actresses
21st-century American comedians